Arcade is a supervillain appearing in American comic books published by Marvel Comics. He first appeared in 1978's Marvel Team-Up #65, the creation of writer Chris Claremont and writer/artist John Byrne. The character is a combination of an evil genius and a hitman who carries out his assassinations via various elaborate traps, often referred to as Murderworld.

Arcade's first intended victims were Spider-Man and Captain Britain but since Arcade's Murderworld games always leave the outcome up to chance, the duo defeated Arcade and escaped with their lives. Over the years Arcade has targeted a multitude of Marvel heroes, often focusing on the X-Men and associated members of X-Factor, X-Force and Excalibur. In what is considered the "game changer" for Arcade, Avengers Arena, he managed to kidnap 16 superpowered teens and forced them to kill each other for survival in his latest version of Murderworld; unlike most Murderworld schemes, this endeavor yielded several casualties.

Arcade has appeared in a number of other Marvel properties outside of comic books, in X-Men: Evolution voiced by Gabe Khouth, and in the Ultimate Spider-Man animated series voiced by Eric Bauza. He has also appeared as one of the main villains in a number of video games, including X-Men: Madness in Murderworld, Spider-Man/X-Men: Arcade's Revenge, Marvel: Ultimate Alliance, Spider-Man: Edge of Time and Marvel: Avengers Alliance.

Publication history

Arcade was created by Chris Claremont and John Byrne. Arcade first appeared in Marvel Team-Up #65.

The same storyline was reprinted shortly thereafter in the black-and-white comic Marvel UK title Super Spider-Man & Captain Britain #248).

Arcade has regularly been a guest villain in the majority of Marvel comics appearances he has made throughout the years since his introduction. His earliest encounter with the X-Men team occurred in the pages of Uncanny X-Men #122–124. Some time later he would encounter the team again, this time partnered with Dr. Doom in issues #145-147. Arcade also makes an appearance in The Uncanny X-Men #197 (featuring Colossus).

Fictional character biography
Arcade affects a manner of dress and speech that makes him appear to be a comedic character. This is part of his overall theme, which extends into his preferred method of murder, an underground funhouse of colorful deathtraps, usually decked out in cheery colors and disguised as an amusement park, which he has dubbed "Murderworld".

Arcade's back-story, up to and including his real name, remains largely unknown even to the present. According to the man himself, he was born into an extremely wealthy family and lived much of his early life, depending on the telling, on a ranch in Texas, or in a mansion in Beverly Hills. At the age of either eighteen or twenty-one, his allowance was cut off by his father, who declared that he did not deserve it. In retaliation, Arcade murders his father, thus inheriting all of the man's vast estate.

Arcade became a freelance assassin, traveling across the world, killing people in rather mundane fashions, and amassing even more wealth than he already had. Discovering an aptitude for technology, Arcade designed and built his first Murderworld, a subterranean evil lair disguised as an amusement park. From this base, and with the help of two mysterious assistants named Miss Locke and Mr. Chambers, he reemerged as the world's most expensive hitman. For the price of $1 million, he would tailor Murderworld to exploit the specific weaknesses of his targets and then watch as they are killed by a variety of colorful deathtraps strewn throughout the facility.

However, one of his "gimmicks" is that he always deliberately leaves each target a small chance of survival. In one instance, when the girlfriend of one of his captives begged him "If you're going to kill them, at least have the decency to do it quickly, painlessly!" Arcade laughs and replied, "Decency's dull... besides, miss, your way, they're dead and that's that. My way, they've got a chance. Not much of one, but a chance." This sets Arcade notably apart from most other villains who use deathtraps; while most villains believe that their death machines are infallible, Arcade likes to give them a chance on purpose, for the sport of it.

Since his first attempt to slay the unlikely duo of Spider-Man and Captain Britain, Arcade has tangled, at one time or another, with a large number of heroes and teams of heroes. In addition to battling the X-Men, X-Factor, X-Force and Excalibur as groups, he has attempted to kill many individual members, usually in pairs. Examples of this include Gambit and Wolverine, Colossus and Shadowcat, Iceman and Angel, Nightcrawler, Northstar, Meggan, and Dazzler,.

Other would-be victims of Murderworld have included Green Goblin (Phil Urich), Hercules Johnny Blaze, Patsy Walker, Gwenpool, Iron Man and The Thing and the Micronauts.

Courtney Ross is one of the few non-super-powered civilians to escape Arcade's attention alive. She survives for some time due to outwitting multiple opponents (such as the Crazy Gang) and discovers a talent for improvisational comedy. In the end, she is rescued by the superhero team Excalibur. The entire situation gives her a new outlook and appreciation for life (though she is soon killed by an unrelated villain after her escape).

In another confrontation with Excalibur, Arcade trapped the team in a Murderworld programmed as a Looney Tunes parody, called the Loonies. He was revealed to be the "Wizard of Oz" of this world after Excalibur had to go down the yellow brick road.

At one point Arcade entraps the two otherworldly warriors, Adam X and Shatterstar, who team up to survive his plans. Arcade finds himself astonished as the two (mostly Adam) literally kill several of his employees. This causes him to state that the clients will be receiving a refund and the two are not to be dealt with in the future. Shatterstar attempts to kill Arcade, but he only destroys a robotic double.

The battle with Ghost Rider came when Arcade, having taken his show on the road, joins up with Blaze's Quentin Carnival; his Murderworld folded out from the back of a semi. Blaze rampages through the fold-out Murderworld, which he discovers is infested with demonic beings, destroying all the obstacles in his sight and killing what he can. He then leaves Arcade trapped in its depths. Arcade's trailer, now more normal-shaped, is driven out into the desert and abandoned.

Prior to a confrontation with Wolverine and Gambit, he murdered his assistant Miss Locke in a fit of rage. During the struggle, she wounded him with a carving knife and scarred much of his face. Over time, Arcade recovered from the physical trauma (presumably through facial surgery, though that has never been confirmed or even addressed in future stories) and even built a series of Miss Locke androids, virtually identical to her in every way, to replace his now-dead companion.

In the three-part miniseries called "Claws", Arcade secretly creates a Kraven the Hunter robot, with the "assistance" of White Rabbit, in an attempt to kill both Wolverine and Black Cat. The two heroes overwhelm Arcade and the White Rabbit and strand them in the dinosaur-filled wilds of the Savage Land.

He is responsible for the destruction of Mutant Town, as part of a botched plan to kidnap X-Factor's Rictor. He later resurfaced, confronting Deadpool and Hercules, Dazzler, Human Torch and the Impossible Man. and the Young Allies and Avengers Academy.

Avengers Arena and Undercover
In a shift from his usual modus operandi, Arcade is responsible for the "Avengers Arena." He and a new associate named Miss Coriander abduct 16 teenage superheroes (several with ties to the Avengers, including several members of Avengers Academy) and strand them on a deserted island, re-modified as an elaborate Murderworld location, forcing them to fight to the death. The heroes Mettle, Red Raven, Kid Briton, Juston Seyfert, Apex, and Nara do not survive this Murderworld encounter. (Nico Minoru of the Runaways is also killed, but the powers of her Staff of One resurrect her before the series' end)

Months later, in the pages of Avengers Undercover, Arcade has cashed in on the success of Avengers Arena in the villainous underground nation of Bagalia. Several Murderworld survivors reunite and are convinced by fellow hero Cullen Bloodstone to kill Arcade at the Massacre Casino in revenge for his actions. After a chaotic battle, Hazmat finally kills Arcade by destroying him with a concentrated radiation burst. However, it was later revealed that Arcade was actually alive the entire time, imprisoned in a Masters of Evil cell (by Baron Zemo, with assistance from his now former comrade Ms. Coriander) and that Hazmat had in reality killed a clone made by members of the Masters of Evil; all revealed as an effort to coerce the heroes to turn against the Avengers and to join them. After the Masters of Evil get away on a hijacked Helicarrier, it was shown that they had strapped Arcade to the front of it.

Partnership with Wilson Fisk
Arcade later encountered Gwenpool at a time when Arcade had trapped members of the MODOK organization and Walrus in his latest Murderworld. With help from Deadpool, Gwenpool rescued the captives and assisted Deadpool in defeating Arcade. Arcade later set a trap for Hellcat and She-Hulk on Coney Island.

He had most recently moved his enterprises to Las Vegas and was embroiled in his usual games of life & death with Elektra. In addition, he collaborated with Screwball where he gave her the training, equipment, and exclusive streaming rights that she needed. During this encounter he revealed that he'd partnered with Wilson Fisk to eliminate certain heroes "from the board," such as Elektra, Hellcat, Gwenpool, Deadpool and others, explaining their previous encounters. After Elektra put an end to his Vegas operation, Arcade found his way to Madripoor and encountered Spider-Man and Deadpool.

Arcade Industries
In the prelude to the "Hunted" storyline, Arcade and his company Arcade Industries assisted Kraven the Hunter and Last Son of Kraven in preparation for his upcoming hunt in Central Park. He started by having King Cobra, Rhino, Scorpion, Stegron, Tarantula, and Vulture be branded the Savage Six after they were apprehended for Kraven the Hunter by Taskmaster and Black Ant. When Arcade offered to test an automaton called the Hunter-Bot which contains Kraven the Hunter's physical characteristics, a Great Hunt participant named Bob used the VR Goggles to help test it out on Iguana. As Iguana attacked the Hunter-Bot, Bob channeled his anger from life failures and controlled the Hunter-Bot into using a special club which tore into Iguana's hide. When Arcade's Hunter-Bots are unleashed on the animal-themed superhumans, they managed to kill Bison, Gazelle of the Salem's Seven, and Mad Dog. Then a Hunter-Bot killed Gibbon as Spider-Man stays by his side in Gibbon's final moments. It was mentioned by Spider-Man and Toad to the other animal-themed superhumans that Arcade's Hunter-Bots controlled by the participants have killed Mandrill and Man-Bull. Arcade receives Vermin from Taskmaster and Lizard. Kraven has Arcade tell Vulture that there is a chance to break the forcefield by killing more Hunter-Bots. Vermin is being kept captured by Arcade who found him due to Taskmaster and Lizard showing Arcade his location. Vermin bites Arcade's finger in defiance. In fear of being killed by Arcade, Vermin reveals that Lizard and Taskmaster are working against Arcade. Arcade puts a serum into Vermin's skin causing him to spawn clones of him in the cage. When the Great Hunt ends, Captain Marvel shows up to confront Arcade while the controllers of the Hunter-Bots are confronted by Captain America who plans to have a conversation with them about New York's hunting laws.

Arcade's other impacts
One of his old facilities was used as a headquarters by the superhero team X-Force. They planned to use it as a base for crimefighting and even attended a nearby college out of it. Arcade later destroys the base remotely; X-Force barely escapes with their lives.

Another old Murderworld location was converted into a training room by an incarnation of the New Warriors.

Madripoor Island-ruler Viper had bought one of Arcade's Murderworld facilities and used it to deceive the X-Men, threatening the city of London with nuclear weapons.

On one occasion, Arcade experimented with what he called "Video Murder Machines", using a laser-like beam to abduct targets into a virtual environment where the victims would engage in deadly video game type scenarios. He intended to abduct the X-Men but accidentally captured the Micronauts with whom he was unfamiliar. The Micronauts (Arcturus Rann, Devil, Microtron, Nanotron) were able to eventually escape the virtual environments through Microtron's hacking into the system. The premise was inspired by the then recent 1982 Disney film Tron.

Powers and abilities
Arcade has no superhuman powers but has absolute genius-level knowledge of technology far ahead of conventional science, particularly in the fields of robotics and mechanical and electrical engineering. Usually when he appears to be captured, it turns out to be a robot. It is implied that he is an expert in conventional assassination, including ranged weapons, poison, and sabotage, all of which became elements in Murderworld.

In Agent X #5, it was revealed that Arcade also has some medical skills which he uses to save Agent X's life.

In the Avengers Arena series, Arcade easily held back a cadre of 16 high-powered teenage superheroes seemingly without having to resort to mechanical or technological devices of any sort. He displayed the ability to create force fields, proved to be nearly invulnerable to energy blasts without the force field, controlled the motor functions of his 16 captives all at the same time, employed telekinesis, caused nearby matter to form into a throne for him to sit on, and effortlessly blew apart an almost-invulnerable mutant with a simple gesture. However, these abilities are the result of technology provided by his henchwoman, Miss Coriander, and can only be manifested within the confines of the Antarctica Murderworld.

Associates
 Miss Locke – Arcade's bodyguard and chief enforcer, is an expert in martial arts and gun combat. According to a flashback sequence in Avengers Arena #7 (2013), he murdered her in cold blood despite her years of faithful service once she, in Arcade's mind, had tried to get "too close" to him by having an emotional and physical relationship.
 Mr. Chambers – Arcade's henchman who has displayed electronic and mechanical skill and is thus in charge of Murderworld's system operations and maintenance. In several appearances he is the driver of a vehicle (disguised as a garbage truck) that would often capture Arcade's victims for transport back to Murderworld.
 Miss Coriander – Arcade's latest henchwoman, she claims to be responsible for the vast array of powers that Arcade currently employs in his underground base seen in the "Avengers Arena" storyline. She appears to far surpass even Arcade in terms of knowledge about superhuman powers and how to counter them, and has gifted Arcade with a vastly powerful set of abilities that she has purloined from cutting-edge technology, exotic energy sources, and magical power. She later betrays Arcade after his supposed death and joined up with Baron Zemo's Masters of Evil.

Other versions

Age of Apocalypse
In the Age of Apocalypse timeline, Arcade is a member of the Marauders, a heavily armed group of human traitors who work for Apocalypse, alongside Red, Dirigible, and the Owl. He is killed by Gwen Stacy and Clint Barton.

Age of X
In the Age of X universe, Arcade (real name Harcourt Teesdale) was the prison governor of the Alcatraz Island mutant prison. He was responsible for making Basilisk kill his brother Havok. Basilisk later escaped and killed Arcade.

Deadpool Kills the Marvel Universe
It is revealed that Arcade has been captured by Deadpool and forced to build deathtraps used to kill various members of the X-Men. He begs Wolverine to save him, horrified by the things Deadpool wants him to build. Wolverine instead kills Arcade for his involvement.

Marvel Adventures
In this version, Arcade has an actual amusement park in order to entertain the kids; he is skillful in robots and highly arrogant. After Mister Fantastic ruins his robots, he decides to prove he is superior to Mr. Fantastic and lures him into Murderworld. There, Mr. Fantastic defeats all the traps and turns all the robots against Arcade. Arcade is taken into custody and Mr. Fantastic learns to be more tactful.

Later, Arcade traps high school student Flash Thompson in a new arcade machine and uses the young video gamer as a tester to destroy New York City. Eventually, Spider-Man breaks up Arcade's scheme and saves his schoolmate.

Secret Wars (2015)
During the "Secret Wars" storyline, Arcade is the master of ceremonies at the Killiseum, an arena on the outskirts of the Battleworld domain of Doomstadt that is built to entertain the masses of Battleworld. Here, he encountered such heroes as Captain America and the Hulk and Thunderbolt Ross the War Machine. He also oversees the Ghost Racers event, which pits the various individuals possessed by the Spirit of Vengeance (including Carter Slade, Johnny Blaze, Danny Ketch, Alejandra Blaze, and Robbie Reyes) against one another in violent races around a booby-trapped track. Thanks to the determined leadership of the unbeaten Reyes, the Ghost Racers would eventually break free of their captivity and kill Arcade.

Ultimate Marvel
In the Ultimate Marvel universe, Arcade is portrayed as a taller, fitter gaming prodigy who invented a literal first-person shooter (which is called Murderworld). His sister was killed by Magneto in the bridge explosion in Ultimate War, giving him a hatred of mutants. He is apparently a skilled hunter and tracker, equipped with various high tech weapons and equipment. When the Ultimate Universe version of Longshot is found guilty of murdering a Genoshan politician, he is sentenced to participate in a reality TV show in which he is stranded on an island and hunted by opponents. As Arcade makes his way through the island jungle, he encounters three X-Men trying to save the prisoner. He subdues them and is about to kill Nightcrawler when Longshot knocks him unconscious. He is last seen being tied to a tree by Colossus with some scraps of iron.

What If?
In a reality where Wolverine was transformed into the Horseman of War by Apocalypse and then killed his maker and ran rampant on the Marvel Universe, Arcade was one of many X-foes who were slain by the rampaging mutant.

In other media

Television
 A variation of Arcade appears in the X-Men: Evolution episode "Fun and Games", voiced by Gabe Khouth. This version is reimagined as Webber Torque, a high school gamer who calls himself "Arcade". He is tricked by Mystique posing as "Risty Wilde" into believing the X-Mansion's Danger Room is an elaborate video game, which he uses to attack the X-Men, whom he believes to be game characters. Despite nearly killing the X-Men, he apologizes for playing the "video game" without permission.
 Arcade appears in the Ultimate Spider-Man episode "Game Over", voiced by Eric Bauza. This version is an technopathic Asian-American mutant who is willing to use his abilities to lure superheroes to Madland for his own childish amusement, regardless of his actions' possible consequences.
 Arcade appears in M.O.D.O.K., voiced by Alan Tudyk.

Video games
 Arcade appears in X-Men: Madness in Murderworld.
 Arcade appeared in Spider-Man/X-Men: Arcade's Revenge.
 Arcade appears as a boss in Marvel: Ultimate Alliance, voiced by Quinton Flynn. This version is a member of Doctor Doom's Masters of Evil. Arcade also appears in Deadpool, Black Panther, and Storm's simulation discs while Murderworld serves as a stage for certain characters.
 A Marvel 2099-inspired incarnation of Arcade appears in the Nintendo DS version of Spider-Man: Edge of Time, voiced by Jim Cummings. This version controls a cyber-arena game called Murder Galaxy to hunt down and destroy heroes in front of a live audience and seeks to challenge the stranded present-day Spider-Man, only to be defeated.
 Arcade appears in Marvel: Avengers Alliance.

Toys
 An Arcade action figure was produced as part of a Super Villains assortment of Marvel Legends action figures released in June 2021.

References

External links
 Arcade at Marvel.com
 Arcade at Marvel Wiki
 Arcade at Comic Vine
 Profile at Spiderfan.org

Characters created by Chris Claremont
Characters created by John Byrne (comics)
Comics characters introduced in 1978
Fiction about death games
Fictional characters from Los Angeles
Fictional assassins in comics
Fictional comedians
Fictional engineers
Fictional clowns
Fictional toymakers and toy inventors
Fictional mass murderers
Marvel Comics scientists
Fictional kidnappers
Marvel Comics male supervillains
Marvel Comics telekinetics
Video game bosses